Ludovic Djé (born 22 July 1977) is a French retired footballer of Ivorian descent, who now works as a manager at Seculand.

Career

Dje started his senior career with AFC Creil. In 2005, he signed for Stockport County in the English Football League Division Three, where he made eleven appearances. After that, he played for English clubs Hayes & Yeading United and East Thurrock United before retiring.

References

External links 
 County: Dje plea to Turner 
 County won't let a Dje go by 
 Hatters to keep Dje 
 Duo on trial at Colchester 
 at Footballdatabase.eu

1977 births
Living people
French sportspeople of Ivorian descent
Stockport County F.C. players
Hayes & Yeading United F.C. players
East Thurrock United F.C. players
French footballers
French expatriate footballers
Expatriate footballers in England
Expatriate footballers in Belgium
French expatriate sportspeople in England
French expatriate sportspeople in Belgium
Association football midfielders
Association football forwards
Association football defenders